Clarkson Secondary School is a high school in Clarkson community of Mississauga, Ontario, Canada; designated Ward 18 by the Peel District School Board. Clarkson is an average school in both population (11th, at 866 
students) and age (13th, built in 1969) of the entire Peel range of 28 public secondary schools.  It is also known as the "Peel Academy for International Students".

School Design

Original Plan 
Clarkson was designed like many 1970s-era schools in Ontario as part of an experimental "open-concept" design.  On the ground floor, the cafeteria and auditorium are central to the design; a tech/drama wing, staff room, and gymnasiums are placed on the west side, while a classroom wing adorns the east side.  These were open to the hallways, to other classrooms, separated only by pillars.

Other schools using the same concepts include The Woodlands Secondary School, Bayridge Secondary School, and St. Thomas More Catholic School.

Demise of the Open-Concept Design 
During the late 1970s, the design was abandoned for a more traditional approach, as the open-concept design proved deficient in many aspects: notable, the leakage of noise from other classes.  The school to this day has very few proper walls in its main section, with thin, temporary walls shielding the view of other classes.  The sound spill still remains a problem in many of the school's classes.

Extracurriculars 
Clarkson's sports teams include field hockey, football, basketball, volleyball, ice hockey, soccer, cricket, baseball, wrestling teams; as well as many after-school groups, including cross country, golf and others like the anime club, the PALS, and several drama presentations per year. A full list is here on their website.

The local Studenwrites student-written drama festival is held in the school's 160-seat theatre, as is a division of the Sears Ontario Drama Festival. The school's paper is the Clarkson Clarion.

Cancer Drive 
For part of the school year, the Clarkson Cancer Drive is hosted annually in late April as a fundraiser for Camp Oochigeas, a camp for cancer-stricken children.  The 2006 year raised $26,500 over a period of one week from a myriad of fundraising events run by individual classrooms, as well as the "dunk tank", "milk chug", "rent-a-friend".
In 2012 they beat their all-time record, raising $27,142 for Camp Oochigeas.

In 2014 they beat that record again raising $30,001. In 2015, they blew the record out of the water, raising $43,023.08 in support of Camp Oochigeas. In 2016, they raised a very notable $40,020. They once again broke the record in 2017 with a total amount of $43,320.17.

Lorne Park 
Clarkson has been known to have a rivalry with the neighbouring school: Lorne Park Secondary School.

This rivalry started in 1969, the year that Clarkson opened. The building was not finished in time for the beginning of the school year and so Clarkson students were "hosted" by Lorne Park from September to December.

The school day operated on two shifts with Lorne Park students taking the morning shift and Clarkson students (bused to Lorne Park) taking the afternoon shift.

Programs 
French immersion
English as a Second Language
International Program
Spanish Program
Specialist High Skills Major - Manufacturing (Grade 11-12)

Notable alumni 

Brad Boyes - NHL hockey player
Francis D'Souza - CityTV Personality
Sean Jones - R&B singer
Don Kerr - Multi-instrumentalist and record producer
Matt Kudu - CFL football player
Shaun Majumder - Comedian, writer, and actor
M. H. Murray - Filmmaker
John River - Rapper
Camilla Scott - Actress and host of the television show The Camilla Scott Show
Barbara Turnbull - Journalist and Activist for people with Disabilities
Debbie Van Kiekebelt - Track & Field star and former Citytv personality
Phil X - Session Guitarist

See also
List of high schools in Ontario

References

External links 
 Clarkson Secondary School website

Peel District School Board
High schools in Mississauga
Educational institutions established in 1970
1970 establishments in Ontario